The  are a group of kofun—megalithic tombs—in Sakai, Osaka Prefecture, Japan. Originally consisting of more than 100 tombs, only less than 50% of the key-hole, round, and rectangular tombs remain.

The , the largest kofun in Japan, is believed to have been constructed over a period of 20 years in the mid 5th century during the Kofun Period.  While it cannot be accurately confirmed, it is commonly accepted that the tomb was built for the late Emperor Nintoku. The Imperial Household Agency of Japan treats it as such.

Location
The Mozu Kofun Cluster is located in the city of Sakai which is within Osaka Prefecture. The tumuli are  built on a plateau overlooking Osaka Bay near the ancient coastline and are distributed in a range of about four kilometers from east-to-west and north-to-south.The Furuichi Kofun Cluster is located in nearby Habikino and Fujiidera cities.

History
In the Japanese archipelago, more than 20,000 tumuli (kofun), which are mounds of earth and stones erected over graves of the ruling class, were built between the later part of the 3rd century and the 6th century. It was the peak period of building such mounds. They represent a cultural tradition which is an expression of "forms, and design of the kofun" of the sociopolitical hierarchical order and the link that was prevalent during that period between regions. This period is termed as the Kofun Period. The most prominent imperial mausolea in this cluster of tumulus are those of Emperor Nintoku and Emperor Richū.

There are 44 burial mounds in the Mozu cluster, including those that are partially destroyed. Of these, 19 have been designated as national historic sites, and separately, the Imperial Household Agency has ruled three to be Imperial mausoleums, two to be "Tomb Reference Sites", and 18 to be "baichō", or ancillary mausoleums connected with an Imperial mausoleum. There used to be more than 100 burial mounds, but due to the rapid development of residential land after World War II, more than half of the burial mounds were destroyed.

In 2010, the Japanese government proposed that the Daisen Kofun and the entire cluster of Mozu Tombs and Furuichi Tombs be designated as a UNESCO World Heritage Site. 9 years later on 6 July 2019, the site was approved and inscribed as a UNESCO World Heritage Site under Criteria: (iii) and (iv) as the Mozu-Furuichi Kofun Group: Mounded Tombs of Ancient Japan.

Features
The kofun are found in many shapes and dimensions in varying patterns. Some are of simple circular or square shape (empun and hōfun). The larger ones are keyhole-shaped (zempō kōenfun); they represent the highest class of kofun and were built in great detail. The three prominent aspects of these kofun are their massive size and being surrounded by several moats and many secondary kofun.

In the Osaka Plain and Nara Basin, which were the cultural centre of the Kofun Period, the rounded keyhole-shaped tombs were built extending to very large lengths, out of which the Mozu-Furuichi Kofun Clusters are the most prominent. These are in two kofun groups which are dated to the later part of 4th and early part of 6th centuries. These kofun are of the largest dimensions in the country. This cluster also has the Richū-tennō-ryō Kofun, made of a tumulus of  length and said to be the third largest in the country.

It has the Ōjin-tennō-ryō Kofun of  length which is said to be the second largest in the country.

A feature of these funerary mounds is that they contain – along with the buried people – grave goods made of iron, weapons worn by individuals including arrowheads, swords, hoe and spade tips, and many other similar items. Also found in the mounds are antiquities made of gilded bronze such as horse tacks and sash buckles.

Enclosed by three moats, the mound rises approximately 35m above the surrounding terrain. The highest point is 47m, making it visible to the seafarers in nearby Osaka Bay.

Today, the tomb is off-limits and protected by the Imperial Household Agency in the centre of Sakai City.  The moats have been maintained and provide a sanctuary for fish and waterbirds.  The mound itself is completely overgrown by vegetation.  A viewing platform from the second (middle) moat is accessible at the south side of the site.  The viewing platform is 500m away from Mozu Station on the Hanwa Line and is directly across the street from the Sakai City Museum.  This museum provides visitors with information about the kofun and its history.

Gallery

See also
List of Historic Sites of Japan (Osaka)
 List of National Treasures of Japan (archaeological materials)
 Buried Cultural Properties
 World Heritage Sites in Japan

References

Bibliography

External links

  Entry on UNESCO World Heritage tentative list
  Mozu Kofun database
  Decorated Kofun Database

Kofun
Buildings and structures in Osaka Prefecture
Tourist attractions in Osaka Prefecture
History of Osaka Prefecture
World Heritage Sites in Japan
Historic Sites of Japan
Sakai, Osaka